Lake Alice may refer to:

New Zealand
 Lake Alice (Manawatū-Whanganui), a lake
Lake Alice, Manawatū-Whanganui, a geographic area
 Lake Alice Hospital
 Lake Alice (Southland), a lake

United States
 Lake Alice (Gainesville, Florida), a lake on the campus of the University of Florida
 Lake Alice (Hubbard County, Minnesota), a lake
 Lake Alice Township, Hubbard County, Minnesota, a small community 
 Lake Alice (South Dakota), a lake
 Lake Alice (Texas), or Lake Findley, a reservoir
 Lake Alice (Washington), a lake
 Lake Alice (Wyoming), a lake

See also

Alice Lake (disambiguation)